Klagenfurt Hauptbahnhof (German for Klagenfurt Main station; occasionally translated as Klagenfurt Central Station) is the main railway station in Klagenfurt, capital of the Austrian state of Carinthia. It is an important railway junction in southern Austria.

History

The station opened on 1 June 1863, when Klagenfurt received connection to the Southern Railway, one of the main train routes within the Austrian Empire, via the Carinthian branch line to Marburg, Styria (now part of the Drava Valley Railway). One year later, the line was extended to Villach Hauptbahnhof, which quickly superseded Klagenfurt as major Carinthian transportation hub with rail connections to the Brenner Railway at Franzensfeste and the Tarvisio–Udine railway (Pontebbana line) at Tarvisio. In 1906, Klagenfurt received access to the Rosen Valley Railway running from Sankt Veit an der Glan via the Karawanks Tunnel to Assling (Jesenice) in Carniola (present-day Slovenia).

The railway premises located in the present-day district of Sankt Ruprecht south of the city centre were not incorporated into Klagenfurt until 1938. Severely damaged by strategic bombing during World War II the station had to be demolished and completely rebuilt. The reception hall was adorned with a large fresco, created by the local artist Giselbert Hoke (1927–2015) in the style of Pablo Picasso and completed in 1956. The station was extensively renovated from 2002 until November 2015.

Train services

Operated by the Austrian Federal Railways (ÖBB), Klagenfurt station connects to the Drautal (Drava Valley) and Rosental Railway lines. Part of the Pan-European Baltic-Adriatic Corridor, it is scheduled to be operational in 2026.

The station is currently served by the following train connections:
Railjet services Lienz – Villach – Klagenfurt – Vienna
InterCity services Klagenfurt – Salzburg – Linz – Vienna
EuroCity services Dortmund/Frankfurt – Munich – Salzburg – Villach – Klagenfurt
Railjet services Klagenfurt – Villach – Tarvisio – Udine – Venice
EuroNight services Rome/Livorno – Florence – Bologna – Venice – Villach – Klagenfurt – Vienna

Beside long-distance traffic, Klagenfurt is served by ÖBB Regional-Express and Regionalbahn trains. It is also a railway hub of the Carinthian S-Bahn network.

See also

Rail transport in Austria
History of rail transport in Austria

References

External links

Klagenfurt
Railway stations in Carinthia (state)
Railway stations opened in 1863
1863 establishments in the Austrian Empire
Railway stations in Austria opened in the 19th century